The Mangalore Central–Kacheguda Superfast Express is an Express train belonging to South Central Railway zone that runs between  and Kacheguda (Hyderabad) in India. It is currently being operated with 12789/12790 train numbers on bi-weekly basis.

Service

The 12790/Mangaluru Central–Kacheguda SF Express has an average speed of 55 km/hr and covers 1525 km in 27h 35m. The 12789/Kacheguda–Mangaluru Central SF Express has an average speed of 55 km/hr and covers 1525 km in 27h 25m.

Route and halts 

The important halts of the train are:-
Mangalore Central,,,,,,,,,,,,,,,,,,,,,,,,, to Kacheguda.

Coach composition

The train has standard LHB rakes with a max speed of 190 kmph. The train consists of 20 coaches:

 1 AC First Class
 1 AC II Tier
 5 AC III Tier
 7 Sleeper coaches
 3 General Unreserved
 2 End On Generator cum Luggage Rake
 1 Pantry Car

Traction

Both trains are hauled Erode Loco Shed-based WAP-4 electric locomotive from Mangalore to Renigunta. From Renigunta train is hauled by an Erode WDP-4D and vice versa.

Rake sharing

The train shares its rake with 17615/17616 Kacheguda–Madurai Weekly Express.

See also 

 Kacheguda railway station
 Mangalore Junction railway station
 Kacheguda–Madurai Weekly Express

Notes

References

External links 

 17605/Mangaluru Central–Kacheguda Express India Rail Info
 17606/Kacheguda–Mangaluru Central Express India Rail Info

Transport in Hyderabad, India
Transport in Mangalore
Express trains in India
Rail transport in Karnataka
Rail transport in Kerala
Rail transport in Tamil Nadu
Rail transport in Andhra Pradesh
Rail transport in Telangana
Railway services introduced in 2014